The Guramba shrew (Crocidura phaeura) is a species of mammal in the family Soricidae. It is endemic to Ethiopia. Its natural habitats are subtropical or tropical dry forests.

Sources
 Lavrenchenko, L. & Hutterer, R. 2004.  Crocidura phaeura.   2006 IUCN Red List of Threatened Species.   Downloaded on 30 July 2007.

Crocidura
Endemic fauna of Ethiopia
Mammals of Ethiopia
Fauna of the Ethiopian Highlands
Endangered animals
Endangered biota of Africa
Mammals described in 1936
Taxonomy articles created by Polbot